During the 1970–71 season, Red Star Belgrade participated in the 1970–71 Yugoslav First League, 1970–71 Yugoslav Cup and 1970–71 European Cup.

Season summary
Red Star were eliminated by Panathinaikos in the semi-finals of the European Cup. In the Yugoslav Cup final, Red Star defeated Sloboda Tuzla 6–0 on aggregate.

Squad

Results

Yugoslav First League

Yugoslav Cup

European Cup

First round

Second round

Quarter-finals

Semi-finals

See also
 List of Red Star Belgrade seasons

References

Red Star Belgrade seasons
Red Star
Red Star